Franklin Marion Donnelly (October 7, 1869 – February 3, 1953) was a professional baseball player.  He was a right-handed pitcher for parts of two seasons (1893–94) with the Chicago Colts.  For his career, he compiled a 3–1 record in 7 appearances, with a 6.36 earned run average and 7 strikeouts.

Donnelly was born in Tamaroa, Illinois and later died in Canton, Illinois at the age of 83.

See also
 List of Major League Baseball annual saves leaders

References

1869 births
1953 deaths
Major League Baseball pitchers
Baseball players from Illinois
Chicago Colts players
People from Perry County, Illinois
Minor league baseball managers
Peoria Canaries players
Cedar Rapids (minor league baseball) players
Quincy Ravens players
Joliet Convicts players
Aurora Indians players
Macon Central City players
Macon Hornets players
Mobile Blackbirds players
Indianapolis Hoosiers (minor league) players
Omaha Omahogs players
Denver (minor league baseball) players
Jacksonville Jacks players
Springfield, Illinois (minor league baseball) players
Cedar Rapids Rabbits players
Peoria Distillers players
Cedar Rapids Bunnies players
Dayton Veterans players
Rock Island Islanders players
Dayton Old Soldiers players
Marion Glass Blowers players
Springfield Hustlers players
Springfield Senators players
Galveston Sand Crabs players
19th-century baseball players